This is a list of fellows of the Royal Society elected in its seventh year, 1666.

Fellows 
Adrian Auzout (1622–1691)
Robert Bertie (1630–1701)
George Cock (d. 1679)
John Copplestone (1623–1689)
Sir Thomas Crisp  (d. 1715)
William Harrington (d. 1671)
John Hay (1645–1713)
Henry Howard (1628–1684)
Sir Edmond King (1629–1709)
Benjamin Laney (1591–1675)
Nicholas Mercator (1620–1687)
George Morley (1597–1684)
David Murray (d. 1668)
Edward Nelthorpe (1604–1685)
Samuel Parker (1640–1688)
John Robartes (1606–1685)
Sir Paul Rycaut (1628–1700)

References

1666
1666 in science
1666 in England